State Road is an unincorporated community in Champaign County, Illinois, United States. State Road is located along Illinois Route 49, south of Ogden and north of Homer.

References

Unincorporated communities in Champaign County, Illinois
Unincorporated communities in Illinois